Water polo at the 2005 Islamic Solidarity Games was held in Swimming Pool of the General Presidency for Youth Welfare, King Abdullah Sport City, Jeddah from April 14 to April 18, 2005.

Medalists

Results

References
 Results

External links
  kooora.com

2005 Islamic Solidarity Games
Islamic Solidarity Games
2005